Makhambet  (Mahambet, ماحامبەت; , Makhambet) is a town in Atyrau Region, west Kazakhstan. It has a population of 8,905.

References

Atyrau Region
Cities and towns in Kazakhstan